The Lindley Library in London is the largest horticultural library in the world. It is within the headquarters of the Royal Horticultural Society,

Library
The main part of the library is based at 80 Vincent Square, London, within the headquarters of its custodian,   the Royal Horticultural Society (RHS); the site also includes Lindley Hall, one of the Royal Horticultural Halls.  RHS members may borrow books from the London, Wisley and Harlow Carr collections.

The Upper Reading Room is open to the public, and holds the 20th-century material available for loans, along with gardening magazines from around the world. Visitors must register if they wish to use the Lower Reading Room which houses historical collections.

In 1995 the RHS proposed to relocate the main collection from London to Wisley, but architect Rick Mather redesigned the accommodation to make better use of the basement. His design was accepted and the project was carried out between 1997 and 2001. The Heritage Lottery Fund assisted the renovation with a grant, one condition of which was that the library should be opened up to public access.

The library is based upon the book collection of English botanist John Lindley, and has many rare books dating from 1514. It also includes other media such as garden guidebooks, trade catalogues, postcards and press cuttings. As well as horticulture, the collection covers flora, birds and other related subjects. The London site also includes the RHS' collection of paintings and photographs. In 2009 the Library started issuing a series of papers (Occasional Papers).

The London collection suffered minor damage in a fire in July 2011. No valuable works were lost.

Librarians 

The first librarian was W. T. Thiselton-Dyer (1871–1875), later Director at Kew, followed by W. B. Hemsley (1875–1878). Amongst other notable librarians was William Thomas Stearn (1933–1952), who succeeded H. R. Hutchinson. More recently were Peter Stageman (1957) and Dr Brent Elliott who was librarian (1982–2007), and subsequently the RHS historian. He initiated and edited the Occasional Papers.

References

Bibliography 

 
 
 
 
 HR Hutchinson (1927). The Lindley Library: Catalogue of Books, Pamphlets, Manuscripts and Drawings. RHS

External links
Lindley Library, RHS official website

Royal Horticultural Society
Horticultural organisations based in the United Kingdom
Research libraries in the United Kingdom